Mercy College Coolock is a Catholic girls' secondary school in Coolock, Dublin, Ireland. It was founded in 1963 by the Sisters of Mercy. It shares grounds with Coolock House, formerly the home of Catherine McAuley, founder of the Sisters of Mercy, and with Scoil Chaitríona, a girls' primary school.

External links
Mercy College website
Scoil Chaitríona website

Secondary schools in County Dublin
Girls' schools in the Republic of Ireland
Educational institutions established in 1963
1963 establishments in Ireland
Sisters of Mercy schools
Coolock